James Robert Lincoln Diggs (7 November 1866 – April 14, 1923) was an American civil rights leader, college president, pastor, and college football coach.

Early life and studies
Diggs earned degrees from Bucknell University in Lewisburg, Pennsylvania and a Ph.D. from Illinois Wesleyan University in Bloomington, Illinois. He became the first African American to receive a doctorate in sociology in the United States and the ninth overall to receive any doctorate.

Wayland Seminary and Virginia Union
He was a member of the Wayland Seminary faculty when it was merged with Virginia Union University in 1898. He served as the school's head football coach from 1900 to 1901.

College presidencies
He served as the president of several colleges, including Virginia University of Lynchburg (then known as Virginia Seminary) from 1906 to 1908 and Simmons College of Kentucky from 1908 to 1911. He help found the Niagara Movement.

Pastorship
He later became a Baptist pastor, leading congregations in Washington, DC and Baltimore, Maryland.

References

1866 births
1923 deaths
Bucknell University alumni
Illinois Wesleyan University alumni
Virginia Union Panthers football coaches
Virginia Union University faculty
People from Upper Marlboro, Maryland